Richard Kingsmill (born 29 January 1964) is an Australian radio announcer, music journalist and currently Group Music Director of triple j, triple j Unearthed, Double J and ABC Local Radio.

Career
His career at triple j started in 1988 as a producer for station presenters George Wayne, Tracee Hutchison and Tim Ritchie. In 1990, new management at the station forced Kingsmill and many others to re-apply for their jobs. Kingsmill failed to regain his producer position, but landed a presenter position instead.

Since then, he has hosted shows that involve an in-depth knowledge of the current state of the alternative music scene, at both a local and international level. These shows have included The J-Files (1995–2003) and the Australian Music Show (1993–2003).

In 1994, he began hosting triple j's New Releases show. Two years later, this evolved into 1996, a show dedicated to the latest release music from around the world. (The show has changed its name each year, to reflect the current year.) His 2010 show was voted Best Radio Show of the Year by SPA (Street Press Australia) readers nationwide.

In 2003, Kingsmill was promoted to the position of Music Director after the retirement of Arnold Frolows, who had been in the position since Double Jay's inception in 1975. As a result, he cut back his on-air shifts and currently presents only the new music show on a Sunday night.

In May 2012, Kingsmill was voted International Music Director of the year at the Worldwide Radio Summit in Los Angeles.

Kingsmill is the author of two books; triple j's Internet Music Guide (co-written with Stuart Coupe in 1998) and The J-Files Compendium (2002). The latter is a collection of his many music interviews, songlists, quizzes and music trivia sourced from The J-Files.

Kingsmill appeared in the Radiohead documentary Meeting People Is Easy (1998).

When Roy and HG left triple j for Triple M, Kingsmill became the station's longest serving presenter.

In 2009, he presented the triple j Hottest 100 of All Time on Rage with Zan Rowe. He also hosted an Australian music-themed program on Rage in 1998.

In 2009, Kingsmill was executive producer of Before Too Long: Triple J's Tribute to Paul Kelly. The show ran over two nights at the Forum Theatre in Melbourne in November with various artists performing tracks by Paul Kelly, which was recorded for a 3× CD of the same name released in February 2010. It featured John Butler, Missy Higgins, Megan Washington, Dan Sultan, Bob Evans, Paul Dempsey, Katy Steele, Adalita, Clare Bowditch, Dan Kelly, Ozi Batla and Jae Laffer. Along with the show's music director, Ash Naylor, Kingsmill accepted the ARIA Award in 2010 for Best Original Soundtrack/Cast/Show Album.

Sections of Kingsmill's 1999 radio interview with the late singer-songwriter Elliott Smith were used in the 2014 documentary of Elliot's life, Heaven Adores You.

In 2017, Kingsmill became Group Music Director, coordinating the team of music directors for four stations on the ABC national network: triple j, triple j Unearthed, Double J and ABC Local Radio.

Personal life
Kingsmill's older brother, Mark, is the drummer in the Australian rock band Hoodoo Gurus.

Kingsmill completed his secondary education at Sydney Grammar School and studied Mass Communications/Radio at Macquarie University.

References

External links
Richard Kingsmill's page at the Triple J site
Richard Kingsmill's blog
Tsunami Mag feature
Meanjin Feature
The Power Index
Worldwide Radio Summit Awards

Triple J announcers
Living people
1964 births
People educated at Sydney Grammar School
Place of birth missing (living people)
Macquarie University alumni